Eul-yong Ta is a South Korean internet phenomenon used to describe the incident when South Korean footballer Lee Eul-yong slapped Chinese forward Li Yi in the back of his head in a match against China in December 2003, or to describe the slap itself. The incident led to numerous parodies in South Korea.

Eul-yong Ta derives its name from Lee Eul-yong, who was carded for slapping Li Yi in the head, and ta (打), which means strike or blow in Hanja. The term would roughly translate as "Eul-yong Strike" or "Eul Yong Smash" in English.

Background

Koreaphobia
"Koreaphobia" (공한증) has been coined by Chinese journalists to describe expectation of China losing against Korea. The Korea Republic national football team went head-to-head against the Chinese team 26 times as of 2006. The results of the match were 15 wins and 11 draws.

Anti-Chinese sentiment in Korea
The Korean media has said that the popularity of Eul-yong Ta is a result of anger over Chinese-Korean geographical disputes. Prior to the time of the match, South Korea had been involved in geographical disputes with China regarding Goguryeo, Jiandao, and Northeast Project of the Chinese Academy of Social Sciences. In 1998, a Chinese goalkeeper injured Hwang Sun-Hong, the main forward for the national team until his retirement in 2003. This prevented Hwang from playing in the 1998 World Cup in France.

The match
The two countries faced each other during the East Asian Cup 2003. During the match, South Korea was winning by one point after the first half, as Yoo Sang-Chul headed the ball passed by Lee.

In the second half of the game, Chinese forward Li Yi deliberately kicked Lee's right shin after Lee completed a pass. Having recovered from a recent ankle injury, Lee was upset at Li's foul play and slapped Li on the back of his head, thereafter which Li Yi started to roll on the ground grabbing his head. For a while the entire Chinese and Korean squad ran toward the scene resulting in brief ruckus and some degree of physical contact but further conflict did not occur, as the referee awarded a yellow card for Li (simulation) and a red card for Lee (violence).

Reaction and influence

When Lee received a red card for violence, the Korean media accused Li Yi of "Hollywood action." At the same time, the media described Lee's expression in the picture as "proud" and "remorseless." The picture of Li Yi painfully clasping his head in front of Lee who is casting an angry glance at him, accompanied by a video clip of the incident, spread out through the Internet.

Korean websites, especially DC Inside known for high-level digital image editing and digital photography, began to photoshop and produce numerous parodies to ridicule the incident. Initially, the photoshopped works showed Lee holding a hammer or a chainsaw. Photoshopped works of the Korean footballer holding a Korean history textbook in front of the Chinese and another picture of Lee in Eulji Mundeok's armor have also surfaced on the internet.

Gradually, the parodies grew more complex over time as they were altered to resemble movie posters, and statues. Examples of parodies include pictures of Lee holding an electric saw before the Chinese, driving a crane towards Li, and Lee in Goku's costume in his Super Saiyan form. As of June 2006, the number of parodies have exceeded 200. Less frequently, the Chinese athlete (Yang Chen) in the background has been the subject of photoshopping.

Eul-yong Ta has been used to portray anti-Chinese sentiments and other social and political issues of South Korea such as strained relations between Korea and Japan. Eul-yong Ta became popular once again when South Korean gymnast Yang Tae Young lost to Paul Hamm in 2004 Summer Olympics. New parodies continued to be made after 2006 World Cup when Korea lost in a match against Switzerland.

Eul-yong Ta influenced new terms such as Eul-yong Chook and "Zidane-Ta" in South Korea when Zinedine Zidane headbutted Marco Materazzi during the final round of the 2006 World Cup.

Lee's reaction
Lee Eul-yong had seen the parodies of Eul-yong Ta "just once." He regrets the incident and has said that he should have controlled his temper as a veteran on the field. To a question asking him whether he was offended, he responded that he was not offended by the parodies and content "as long as people laughed from the parodies." (그런 건 없다. 사람들이 그걸로 재미있으면 됐다.)

Eul-yong Chook
In late 2005, another picture of Lee began to surface on the internet, which showed him in Bucheon FC's uniform performing a mid-air kick during the match against Suwon Samsung Bluewings. Like Eul-yong Ta, the picture became subject to parodies which include a photoshopped picture of Lee kicking Junichiro Koizumi to reflect the anti-Japanese sentiment in Korea and also Apolo Anton Ohno.

See also
Anti-Chinese sentiment in Korea
Lee Eul-yong
China–South Korea football rivalry

References

External links
Video clip of the Eul-yong Ta incident and the parodies
 Second picture gallery of Eul-yong Ta

Internet memes
South Korean popular culture
Anti-Chinese sentiment in Asia
History of the South Korea national football team